Stokvis may refer to:

 South African hake (Merluccius capensis), a fish called "stokvis" in Afrikaans and Dutch
 Stockfish, a dried whitefish product

People with the surname
 Anthony Marinus Hendrik Johan Stokvis (1855–1924), authority in chronology and genealogy
 Barend Joseph Stokvis (1834–1902), Dutch physiologist and physician
 Ruud Stokvis (born 1943), Dutch rower